Kyle Dugger (born March 22, 1996) is an American football safety for the New England Patriots of the National Football League (NFL). He played college football at Lenoir–Rhyne.

High school career
Primarily playing basketball at Whitewater High School, Dugger did not start on the football team until his senior year. Lenoir–Rhyne, an NCAA Division II program in North Carolina, was one of three schools that offered Dugger, along with NCAA Division III member Berry College and NAIA member Reinhardt University.

College career
After redshirting his freshman year, Dugger became an immediate starter in the Bears secondary his redshirt freshman year. He played cornerback during his redshirt freshman season but switched to safety before his sophomore season, which he also redshirted due to a meniscus injury. He recorded three interceptions and three fumble recoveries during his junior season.

Dugger utilized his athleticism during his senior year, at one point returning two punts for touchdowns within a seven-minute span against Virginia–Wise.
For his play in his senior season, Dugger was awarded the Cliff Harris Award in 2019, given to the best small-school defensive player. Dugger also participated in the 2020 Senior Bowl, where scouts praised his field instincts.

Scouts praised Dugger for his speed on the field, projecting him at either safety, cornerback or returner in the NFL.

Professional career

Dugger was drafted by the New England Patriots with the 37th pick in the second round of the 2020 NFL Draft. He was the first player chosen in that draft who played outside Division I FBS.

2021 
In Week 6, Dugger recorded his first career interception off of Cowboys’ QB Dak Prescott during the 29–35 overtime loss. The next week, Dugger recorded his second straight game with a pick, intercepting Jets’ quarterback Mike White in the 54–13 win. He finished the season with 92 tackles, five passes defensed, and four interceptions.

2022 
In Week 17, Dugger intercepted a pass from Teddy Bridgewater and returned it 39 yards for a touchdown in a 23-21 win over the Dolphins, earning AFC Defensive Player of the Week. He led the league with three defensive touchdowns (two interceptions, one fumble recovery), and finished second on the team with 78 tackles.

References

External links
Lenoir–Rhyne Bears bio

1996 births
Living people
Players of American football from Georgia (U.S. state)
People from Fayetteville, Georgia
American football safeties
Lenoir–Rhyne Bears football players
New England Patriots players